Sir Alistair Allan Horne  (9 November 1925 – 25 May 2017) was a British journalist, biographer and historian of Europe, especially of 19th- and 20th-century France.  He wrote more than 20 books on travel, history, and biography.

Early life, military service, and education
Horne was born on 9 November 1925. He was the only son of Sir Allan Horne (died 1944) and Auriol (née Hay-Drummond), niece of the 13th Earl of Kinnoull. He was educated at Eastacre, then Ludgrove School when it was at Cockfosters and described Ludgrove as a place of "humbug, snobbery and rampant, unchecked bullying" which he thought was intended to toughen the boys up. He seems to have hated Stowe, which he escaped from to America during wartime.

As a boy during World War II, Horne was sent to live in the United States. He attended Millbrook School, where he befriended William F. Buckley Jr., who remained a lifelong friend. Horne served in the RAF (1943–44) and later as an officer in the Coldstream Guards (1944–47). He graduated from Jesus College, Cambridge, as a Master of Arts (MA) and received the degree of LittD from the University of Cambridge (1993).

Personal life
His first marriage was in 1953 to Renira Hawkins, the daughter of Admiral Sir Geoffrey Hawkins. They had three daughters. The marriage was dissolved in 1982, and, in 1987, he married Sheelin Lorraine Ryan, an artist and former wife of Simon Eccles, son of David Eccles, 1st Viscount Eccles. They lived at Turville, Buckinghamshire. 

He campaigned against the opening of a Montessori school adjacent to his Turville home because Reverend Paul Nicolson, the vicar responsible for the project, planned to use the project to fund summer vacations at the school for children from nearby London.

Career
Horne worked as a foreign correspondent for The Daily Telegraph from 1952 to 1955. He was the official biographer of British Prime Minister Harold Macmillan, a work originally published (in two volumes) in 1988. Horne was an Honorary Fellow of St Antony's College, Oxford, and a cricket enthusiast. The Price of Glory: Verdun 1916 received the Hawthornden Prize in 1963.

Horne's 1977 book A Savage War of Peace: Algeria 1954–1962 received the Wolfson Prize in 1978. Following the 2003 American invasion of Iraq, A Savage War of Peace: Algeria 1954–1962 came to be of much interest to American military officers, having been recommended to U.S. President George W. Bush by Kissinger. In October 2006 the book was republished and in January 2007, by phone from his home in England, Horne was invited to take part in an Iraq War discussion panel on the Charlie Rose Show on PBS.  It was reported, in the 2 July 2007 edition of The Washington Post'''', that Horne met with President Bush sometime in mid-2007 at the administration's request." He described his visit in a Daily Telegraph article.

In 2004, Horne was offered the authorship of former U.S. Secretary of State Henry Kissinger's official biography but declined due to the daunting amount of work involved and his age and opted instead to write a volume on one year in Kissinger's life (Kissinger: 1973, The Crucial Year, 2009).

Selected worksReturn to Power: A Report on the New Germany. New York: Praeger, 1956. The Land is Bright. 1958.Canada and the Canadians. Toronto: Macmillan, 1961.The Price of Glory: Verdun 1916. New York: St. Martin's Press, 1962.  Reissued in 1963. The Fall of Paris: The Siege and the Commune, 1870–1871. London: Macmillan, 1965.  Revised edition: Penguin Books 2007, .To Lose a Battle: France 1940. London, Macmillan, 1969.Death of a Generation Neuve Chapelle to Verdun and the Somme 1970The Terrible Year: The Paris Commune, 1871. London, Macmillan, 1971.Small Earthquake in Chile: A Visit to Allende's South America. London: Macmillan, 1972. (Expanded edition, 1990.)A Savage War of Peace: Algeria 1954–1962. London: Macmillan, 1977. Napoleon, Master of Europe 1805–1807. London: Weidenfeld and Nicolson, 1979.  The French Army and Politics, 1870–1970. New York: Peter Bedrick Books, 1984.Harold Macmillan. New York: Viking Press, 1988. [Official biography]Volume I: 1894-1956Volume II: 1957-1986A Bundle from Britain. New York: St. Martin's Press, 1993.
Montgomery, David (co-author). Monty: The Lonely Leader, 1944–1945. New York: HarperCollins, 1994.How Far from Austerlitz? Napoleon, 1805–1815. New York: St. Martin's Press, 1996.  
Horne, A. (ed.).Telling Lives: From W.B. Yeats to Bruce Chatwin. London: Papermac, 2000.Seven Ages of Paris. London: Macmillan, 2002.   American ed., The Age of Napoleon. New York: Modern Library, 2004.  Friend or Foe: An Anglo-Saxon History of France. London: Weidenfeld & Nicolson, 2004. La Belle France: A Short History. Alfred A. Knopf, 2005. The French Revolution. Carlton Books, 2009.Kissinger: 1973, The Crucial Year. Simon & Schuster, June 2009.  But What Do You Actually Do?: A Literary Vagabondage. London: Weidenfeld & Nicolson, 2011. Hubris: The Tragedy of War in the Twentieth Century''.  Harper, 2015.

Honours and awards
 CBE (1992)
 Knight Bachelor (2003)
 Chevalier, Ordre de la Légion d'honneur (1993)
Fellow, Royal Society of Literature (1968)

References

1925 births
2017 deaths
Alumni of Jesus College, Cambridge
Historians of World War I
Historians of World War II
British biographers
British military writers
Coldstream Guards officers
British Army personnel of World War II
British military historians
The Daily Telegraph people
Fellows of the Royal Society of Literature
Commanders of the Order of the British Empire
Knights Bachelor
People educated at Ludgrove School
Chevaliers of the Légion d'honneur
Historians of the Napoleonic Wars
20th-century British writers
21st-century British writers
20th-century British historians
21st-century British historians
Royal Air Force personnel of World War II
20th-century English businesspeople